Pilea cadierei, the aluminium plant or watermelon pilea, is a species of flowering plant in the nettle family Urticaceae, native to China (provinces of Guizhou and Yunnan) and Vietnam. The specific epithet cadierei refers to the 20th-century botanist R.P. Cadière. It has gained the Royal Horticultural Society's Award of Garden Merit.

Description

There are rhizomes formed. The independently upright stems are somewhat succulent and sometimes wood at the base; they are bald. Stems, stipules, petioles and blades are densely covered with spindle-shaped cystoliths. 

The constantly opposite arranged on the stems leaves are divided into petiole and leaf blade. The bald petioles are all almost the same length with a length of 7 to 15 millimeters. The simple, dark green, parchment-like, almost uniformly shaped leaf blades are obovate with a length of 2.5 to 6 centimeters and a width of 1.5 to 3 centimeters with a broad, wedge-shaped or almost rounded blade base and a spiky tip. 

There are three main nerves that are visible at least 3/4 of their length and there are three side nerves on each side. The leaf margins are hardly recognizable to weakly serrated or bitten out. On the upper side of the leaf there are two subdivided white furrows and this results in some silvery raised areas (hence the English designations "aluminum" or "watermelon plant"). The early falling, parchment-like stipules are initially green and brown when dry, and are 10 to 13 millimeters long and elongated with two ribs.

Inflorescence and fruit

The flowering period in China ranges from September to November. Pilea cadierei is single-sex, separated (monoecious). The male, compact, heady inflorescences contain 5 to 125 flowers on 1.5 to 4 cm long inflorescence stems. The bracts are broadly ovoid with a length of about 3 millimeters. The flower stems of the male flowers are 2 to 3 millimeters long and the flower buds are pear-shaped with a length of about 2.5 millimeters. The relatively small, white-pink flowers are fourfold. The male flowers have a length of 2.5 to 3 millimeters and a diameter of 1.8 to 2 millimeters. The four boat-shaped, about 3 millimeter long bracts male flowers grow together up to half their length and cartilaginous in the upper area. The four stamens protrude beyond the chalice and "explode" when shaken. The female flowers are almost seated in the cymose inflorescences. In the female flowers a rudimentary conical carpel is present in each case. With a length of 0.5 to 0.7 millimeters, the durable bracts of the female flowers are half as long as the nut fruit. In the female flowers there is usually only an upstanding fruit leaf and elongated staminodes. The female flowers have a simple style.

The fruits ripen in China between November and December. The nut fruits are always lonely and are egg-shaped and flattened at a length of about 1.5 millimeters. The seeds contain endosperm and a straight embryo with two oval-elliptical or circular cotyledons.

Cultivation
With a minimum temperature of 15°C (59°F), it is cultivated as a houseplant in temperate regions due to its decorative leaves and easy vegetative propagation through cuttings. This plant is nontoxic to cats, dogs, and horses, and so is safe to have around pets.

References

Flora of China
Flora of Vietnam
House plants
cadierei